Khaleng (also Romanized as Khāleng; also known as Khāleng’ī) is a village in Madvarat Rural District, in the Central District of Shahr-e Babak County, Kerman Province, Iran. At the 2006 census, its population was 22, in 8 families.

References 

Populated places in Shahr-e Babak County